

Park Chan-yong (born June 10, 1963 in Hwasun) is a South Korean former professional boxer who competed from 1980 to 1992. He held the WBA bantamweight title in 1987 and challenged for the WBC super-bantamweight title in 1989.

Professional career
Park began his professional career in 1980. On May 24, 1987, after amassing a career record of 24–3–2 with 7 knockouts, Chan-yong was given the opportunity to challenge reigning bantamweight champion, Takuya Muguruma, for his WBA version of the world championship Mugurma's hometown of Moriguchi, Osaka, Japan. Park defeated Muguruma in the 11th round of 15 via technical knockout. Five months after he won the title, in his first title defense, he subsequently lost his championship on October 3, to Wilfredo Vázquez by technical knockout in the 10th round of 15.

After the defeat to Vázquez, Chan-yong moved up to the super-bantamweight division where after a four fight win streak, on December 3, 1989, he got another chance for a world title when he faced reigning WBC super-bantamweight champion of Mexico, Daniel Zaragoza for his championship in Incheon, South Korea. In his last chance to become a world champion again, Park put forth a great effort, losing the fight via split decision.

Chan-yong retired in 1992, after a string of knockout victories against lesser known fighters, ending his career with a record of 33–5–2 with 16 knockouts.

Professional boxing record

See also
List of Bantamweight boxing champions
List of WBA world champions

References

External links

https://boxerlist.com/boxer/chan-young-park/865/
https://234fight.com/boxers-from-the-past/chan-young-park-boxer-wiki-profile/

1963 births
Living people
Super-bantamweight boxers
World boxing champions
World bantamweight boxing champions
World Boxing Association champions
South Korean male boxers
Sportspeople from South Jeolla Province